"The Unsuccessful Self-Treatment of a Case of "Writer's Block"" is a humorous academic article by psychologist Dennis Upper about writer's block. It contains no content except for a title, journal formatting elements, and a humorous footnote.

Published in 1974 in a peer reviewed journal, Journal of Applied Behavior Analysis, it is recognized as the shortest academic article ever and a classic example of humor in science, or at the very least among behavioral psychologists.  It has been cited more than 100 times.

The article received a humorous positive review which was published alongside the article.

The article has led to at least five similarly humorous and peer-reviewed, published replication studies, and several similar papers.

More seriously, the paper is said to be a case reinforcing the image of a writer's block as a "blank page", and encouraging brevity in writing. It has been also used as an example that humor can indeed be found in academic publishing.

This article has also prompted similar scholarly articles.

References

External links

 

1974 documents
Humour in science
Social sciences literature